Actihema msituni is a species of moth in the family Tortricidae. It is found in Kenya.

The wingspan is about 14 mm. The forewings contain white scales and a blackish patch in the costal half, followed by a white patch. The hindwings are light fuscous, with transverse striae.

Etymology
The species name is derived from msituni (the Swahili word for "in the forest") and refers to the name of the type locality and the habitat.

References

Endemic moths of Kenya
Moths described in 2010
Cochylini
Moths of Africa